Warroad High School is a public high school in Warroad, Minnesota, United States. Despite the small size of the community, the school has produced several successful hockey players.

Academics
21% of Warroad students participate in the school's Advanced Placement (AP) program and have a 63% pass rate. The school has a 63% AP exam pass rate.

Athletics 
The Warroad Warriors are a part of the Northwest Conference of the Minnesota State High School League for most sports. For football they are a member of the Heart O'Lakes - Classic Conference. The following varsity sports teams are sanction by Warroad High School:"

Fall
 Cross Country
 Football
 Swimming - Girls'
 Volleyball
Winter
 Hockey - Boys'
 Hockey - Girls'
 Basketball - Boys'
 Basketball - Girls'
Spring
 Golf - Boys'
 Golf - Girls'
 Baseball
 Softball
 Track and Field

Hockey
In 1956, Warroad High School wanted to increase its hockey profile and hired Ken Johannson and Bob Johnson as teachers and coaches of the boys' hockey team. They had previously been roommates for two years at the University North Dakota, and neither knew the other was hired to run the team.

Warroad hockey teams are part of the hockey only Mariucci Conference. The Warriors boys hockey team has won the Class A state hockey tournaments in 1994, 1996, 2003, and 2005. They have also made 10 appearances at the state finals as well as 21 overall tournament appearances.

The Warriors girls hockey team won back-to-back state titles in 2010 and 2011. They have participated and placed in the Minnesota state tournament seven times since 2006.

Activities 
 Knowledge Bowl    
 Robotics
 National Honor Society
 One-Act Play
 Speech
 Student Council
 Band
 Choir

Demographics

As of the 20112012 school year, Warroad was 82% white, 9% American Indian, 8% Asian, 1% Hispanic, 0% Black, 0% Hawaiian/Pacific Islanders, and .2% two or more races. 21% of student were eligible for the Free Lunch Program and 8% were eligible for the Reduced-Price Lunch Program.

Notable alumni 

 Robert Baril  stand-up comedian
 Roger Christian  US Olympic hockey team
 Bill Christian (Class of 1956)  US Olympic hockey team
 Henry Boucha (Class of 1969)  1972 US Olympic hockey team, NHL player
 Alan Hangsleben (Class of 1971)  US National hockey team, NHL player
 Dave Christian (Class of 1977)  1980 US Olympic hockey team, NHL player
 Gigi Marvin (Class of 2005)  US women's Olympic hockey team
 TJ Oshie (Class of 2005) (transferred sophomore year)  Current Washington Capitals and United States men's national ice hockey team forward
 Brock Nelson (Class of 2009)  NHL player

References 

Public high schools in Minnesota
Education in Roseau County, Minnesota